Purple is a UK-based technology firm that specializes in intelligent spaces. The company offers a three core products guest WiFi, business analytics and digital wayfinding. 

Purple introduced social media logins in the WiFi login process, where a customer has to like or follow or promote the social media page of the retail business to get the access of WiFi and in the process precious customer data also gets captured on its web portal. The captured data by Purple's integrated WiFi and location analysis solution can be used by the retail businesses for customer relationship management.

History
Purple was founded in 2012 by Gavin Wheeldon. The company was incorporated in 2012 as 'Purple WiFi' to provide custom WiFi solutions for the retail businesses.

Purple remained bootstrapped until 2015, before receiving its first round venture funding of $5 million from Sir Terry Leahy, CEO of Tesco, Bob Willett, Iain MacDonald and Bill Currie from the William Currie Group and Juno Capital, a leading alternative asset manager. The initial funding helped the company in building the technology and establishing roots in the international market. Purple was used by enterprises in events, leisure, hospitality, tourism, education, and retail industries. Purple signed a distributor agreement with Purdicom, Ingram Micro, e92plus, Minerva, Wood Communications, Alternetivo, Chuanhow Technology Ltd, SonicNet, Wavelink, Smart Network Distribution, Baltic Premier Partners, WAV Inc, MICRO-LINK, C-MI Labs, Instillery Group and others. The software started out as an analytics ad measurement tool, and expanded to a whole suite.

The company expanded globally by partnering with major companies as its resellers in Australia, US, New Zealand, India, UK and other countries. In January 2016, the company rebranded its name to Purple.

Purple expanded its product portfolio in 2019 by acquiring  LogicJunction specialists in indoor wayfinding. During the COVID-19 pandemic Purple also introduced a solution that uses 2D & 3D sensors to provide businesses with presence and location insights around building occupancy and how people move around venues.

Awards and recognition
2014 - Best new opportunity at the Synaxon UK 2014 Awards.
2014 - Northern Tech Awards 2014 Rising Star
2015 - Named as finalists in the Digital Entrepreneur Awards in the Technological Advancement category for Technical Innovation within the Public Sector
2015 - Named as an "Emerging Vendor" by CRN
2015 - Named a Top 20 Rising Star at Northern Tech Awards
2015 - Retail Innovation of the Year 2015 at the Retail Systems awards

Competition 
The top competitors in Purple 's competitive set are Aislelabs, Queentessence, Cloud4Wi, RaGaPa, KodaCloud, Turnstyle Solutions, Eleven Wireless, Zenreach, Skyfii, GlobalReach, i2e1, Benu Networks, Presence Orb and UCOPIA.  Recently with the interest from Google and Facebook increasing in the Wi-Fi space, investor interest has increased.

See also 

 Aislelabs
 Aruba Networks
 Proximity Marketing
 Mobile location analytics

References

Companies based in Manchester